Duméril is a French surname. Notable people with the surname include:

 André Marie Constant Duméril (1774–1860) (author abbreviation in zoology: Duméril)
 Auguste Duméril (1812–1870), French zoologist, son of André

French-language surnames